The Indiana House of Representatives is the lower house of the Indiana General Assembly, the state legislature of the U.S. state of Indiana. The House is composed of 100 members representing an equal number of constituent districts. House members serve two-year terms without term limits. According to the 2010 U.S. Census, each State House district contains an average of 64,838 people.

The House convenes at the Indiana Statehouse in Indianapolis.

Terms and qualifications
In order to run for a seat for the Indiana House of Representatives one must be a citizen of the United States, has to be at least 21 years of age upon taking office, and should reside in the state of Indiana for 2 years and in the district to represent for at least 1 year at the time of the election.

Representatives serve terms of two years, and there is no limit on how many terms a representative may serve.

Composition of the House

Officers

Standing committees
.

Members of the Indiana House of Representatives

†Member was initially appointed to the seat.

History

The Indiana House of Representatives held its first session in the first statehouse in the original state capital of Corydon and the first speaker of the body was Isaac Blackford. Under the terms of the constitution of 1816, state representatives served one-year terms, meaning elections were held annually. In 1851, the constitution was replaced by the current constitution and terms were lengthened to two years, but sessions were held biennially. In 1897, it unanimously passed a bill determining the value of Pi to exactly 3.2. However, the bill was never voted upon in the State Senate. A 1972 constitutional amendment allowed for a short legislative session to be held in odd numbered years.

2012 Election
On November 6, 2012, the Republican Party in Indiana expanded their majority in the House of Representatives from 60 members in the 117th General Assembly to 69 members, a "quorum-proof" majority. The Republicans were able to take 69% of the seats, despite having only received approximately 54% of the votes for the state's House of Representatives.

Of the 3 newly elected members of the U.S. House elected to the 113th Congress from Indiana, two are former members of the Indiana House of Representatives. Congresswoman Jackie Walorski (IN-02) represented Indiana's 21st district from 2005 to 2011 and Congressman Luke Messer (IN-06) represented Indiana's 57th district from 2003 to 2007. Congressman Marlin Stutzman (IN-03) was re-elected to a second term, he is a former member of the Indiana House of Representatives where he served Indiana's 52nd district from 2003 to 2009.

Past composition of the House of Representatives

See also

Speaker of the Indiana State House of Representatives
Indiana Senate
Government of Indiana
Politics of Indiana

References

External links
Indiana General Assembly

State House of Indiana at Project Vote Smart
Indiana House Democrats
Indiana House Republicans
2015 Indiana Candidate Guide - Qualifications

Indiana General Assembly
 
State lower houses in the United States
1816 establishments in Indiana